Because is a 1918 British silent drama film directed by Sidney Morgan and starring Lilian Braithwaite, Ben Webster and George Foley. A father locks his daughter up when she refuses to marry the man he has chosen as her husband.

Cast
 Lilian Braithwaite 
 Ben Webster 
 George Foley 
 Joyce Carey 
 Joan Morgan 
 J. Hastings Batson

References

Bibliography
 Low, Rachael. The History of British Film, Volume III: 1914-1918. Routledge, 1997.

External links
 

1918 films
British drama films
British silent feature films
Films directed by Sidney Morgan
1918 drama films
British black-and-white films
1910s English-language films
1910s British films
Silent drama films